Sidney is a village in Champaign County, Illinois, United States. The population was 1,208 at the 2020 census.

History
The Potawatomi Trail of Death passed through here in 1838.

Geography

Government
Sidney has a village president and board of trustees.
Village President: Jason Arrasmith
Village Board of Trustees:
Daniel Gadeken
Leroy Schluter
Tyler Bickers
Donna Hooker
Matthew Laurent
Bret Harris

Demographics

As of the 2020 census there were 1,208 people, 503 households, and 354 families residing in the village. The racial makeup of the village was 93.71% White, 0.33% African American,0.41% Asian, 0.75% from other races, and 4.80% from two or more races. Hispanic or Latino of any race were 2.07% of the population.

There were 503 households, out of which 66.80% had children under the age of 18 living with them, 55.86% were married couples living together, 8.55% had a female householder with no husband present, and 29.62% were non-families. 21.27% of all households were made up of individuals, and 9.74% had someone living alone who was 65 years of age or older. The average household size was 3.03 and the average family size was 2.58.

The village's age distribution consisted of 26.4% under the age of 18, 7.6% from 18 to 24, 25.5% from 25 to 44, 27.9% from 45 to 64, and 12.6% who were 65 years of age or older. The median age was 37.0 years. For every 100 females, there were 95.9 males. For every 100 females age 18 and over, there were 99.4 males.

The median income for a household in the village was $76,250, and the median income for a family was $81,071. Males had a median income of $56,750 versus $43,333 for females. The per capita income for the village was $34,866. About 2.0% of families and 3.3% of the population were below the poverty line, including 3.6% of those under age 18 and none of those age 65 or over.

Notable people

 John Wilson Ruckman, Union Army General with distinction in the Civil War; born in Sidney
 Carolee Schneemann, American artist associated with the Fluxus movement; lived in Sidney while attending University of Illinois

References

External links

 History of Sidney, Il

Villages in Champaign County, Illinois
Villages in Illinois